Plotovka is a rural locality (a khutor) in Volokonovsky District, Belgorod Oblast, Russia. The population was 81 as of 2010. There are 2 streets.

Geography 
Plotovka is located 25 km south of Volokonovka (the district's administrative centre) by road. Blagodatny is the nearest rural locality.

References 

Rural localities in Volokonovsky District